Taenaris selene is a butterfly in the family Nymphalidae. It was described by John Obadiah Westwood in 1851. It is found in the Australasian realm.

Subspecies
T. s. selene (Buru, Moluccas)
T. s. gigas Staudinger, 1888 (Serang)
T. s. sura Brooks, 1944 (Geisser Island)

References

External links
Taenaris at Markku Savela's Lepidoptera and Some Other Life Forms

Taenaris
Butterflies described in 1851